Mbemba Camara is a Guinean boxer. He competed in the men's light middleweight event at the 1980 Summer Olympics. At the 1980 Summer Olympics, he lost to Francisco de Jesus of Brazil.

References

Year of birth missing (living people)
Living people
Guinean male boxers
Olympic boxers of Guinea
Boxers at the 1980 Summer Olympics
Place of birth missing (living people)
Light-middleweight boxers